Sean Patrick Bowers (born August 12, 1968) is a retired U.S. soccer defender.  He spent most of his career playing indoor soccer, earning the 1992 NPSL Rookie of the Year, four-time Defender of the Year and a six-time first team All Star in four different indoor leagues.  He also played four seasons with the Kansas City Wizards in Major League Soccer.  He currently is the General Manager for the San Diego Sockers of the Professional Arena Soccer League.

High school and college
Bowers grew up in San Diego, California where he played his youth soccer with the San Diego Nomads.  He also played goalkeeper at Mira Mesa High School where he was two-time All City.  Following high school, he attended Miramar College for two years before finishing college at Quincy University in Quincy, Illinois.  He played soccer at both Miramar and Quincy.  In 1990, Bowers led Quincy in scoring, being named the team MVP.  He graduated in 1991 with a bachelor's degree in political science.

Player
In 1991, Bowers signed with the San Diego Sockers of the Major Indoor Soccer League (MISL).  While he played in the Sockers season opener, at some point he moved to the Detroit Rockers of the National Professional Soccer League (NPSL).  He was selected as the NPSL Rookie of the Year.  He remained with the Rockers until 1995, winning 1994 and 1995 Defender of the Year honors.  In addition to playing with the Rockers in 1993, Bowers also played a single season with the Sacramento Knights of the Continental Indoor Soccer League (CISL), a summer indoor league.  He was named CISL Defender of the Year.  In 1995 and 1996, he returned to the CISL, this time with the Anaheim Splash.  The Kansas City Wiz of the outdoor Major League Soccer selected Bowers in the third round (26th overall) in the 1996 MLS Inaugural Player Draft.  He played four seasons with the Wizards, serving as the team captain in 1999.  However, he continued to play indoor soccer, returning to the Detroit Rockers in 1997.  He played with the Rockers until 2001, when the team folded.  The Baltimore Blast selected Bowers in the dispersal draft.  That summer, the NPSL also gave way to the new Major Indoor Soccer League (MISL).  Bowers spent two season with the Blast, winning the 2003 league championship with them.  July 16, 2003, the Blast traded Bowers to the San Diego Sockers in exchange for Carlos Farias and the first and second picks in the 2003 Amateur Draft.  He played thirty-three games with the Sockers in 2003–2005, but only five games the next season before the Sockers folded.  Rather than pursuing his playing career further, Bowers elected to retire, settle in his hometown and pursue a coaching career.  In 2009, he joined the San Diego Sockers of the Professional Arena Soccer League.

Futsal
Beginning in 1996, Bowers became a regular part of the U.S. national futsal team.  Two years later, the team took third place in the Futsal Mundialito.  He earned a total of thirty-six caps, scoring five goals, with the U.S. from 1996 to 2004.

Coaching
In 1999, Bowers became an assistant coach with William Jewell College women's soccer team.  This was the start of his coaching career.  Bowers began coaching on the professional level with the Detroit Rockers in 2000–2001.  That season, he served as an assistant coach in addition to playing.  In 2001, he became the head coach with the Detroit Rocker Hawks, winners of the 2001 USASA Women's U.S. Open Cup.  In 2002, he became the interim head coach of the Baltimore Blast.  At the time, the Blast were at the bottom of the standings.  Bowers took them into the playoffs and the Blast ended up winning the MISL championship that season.  In 2003, the Blast traded Bowers to the San Diego Sockers.  When Bowers arrived in southern California, he became an assistant coach with the California Baptist University women's team from 2003 to 2005.  He was elevated to the position of head coach in 2006, taking them to an end of season ranking of ninth in the NAIA.  He also was named the head coach of the San Diego SeaLions of the Women's Premier Soccer League (WPSL) in 2006.  That year the SeaLions went to the WPSL semifinals.  On March 27, 2007, Miramar College announced the creation of a women's soccer team with Bowers as its coach.

Honors
Rookie of the Year
NPSL: 1991–1992

Defender of the Year
NPSL: 1994, 1995
CISL: 1993
MISL II: 2002

First Team All Star
NPSL: 1993, 1995
CISL: 1993, 1995
MISL II: 2002, 2003

References

External links
 Indoor soccer honors
 Southwest Soccer Club profile
 San Diego Sockers bio

1968 births
Living people
American men's futsal players
American soccer coaches
American soccer players
Anaheim Splash players
Baltimore Blast (2001–2008 MISL) players
Continental Indoor Soccer League players
Detroit Rockers players
Association football defenders
Sporting Kansas City players
Major League Soccer players
Major Indoor Soccer League (2001–2008) coaches
Major Indoor Soccer League (2001–2008) players
Major Indoor Soccer League (1978–1992) players
National Professional Soccer League (1984–2001) players
Professional Arena Soccer League players
Quincy Hawks men's soccer players
Sacramento Knights players
San Diego Sockers (2001–2004) players
San Diego Sockers (original MISL) players
San Diego Sockers (PASL) players
Soccer players from San Diego